Sello Moloto (born August 27, 1964 in Claremont Village, Transvaal) is the former premier of Limpopo. He was succeeded by Cassel Mathale on March 3, 2009 when he switched from the African National Congress to the Congress of the People and was designated as COPE's candidate for premier of Limpopo; he did not regain his seat in the later general election. His wife, Ramokone Moloto, died in July 2009.

References

1964 births
Living people
People from Mogalakwena Local Municipality
Northern Sotho people
African National Congress politicians
Congress of the People (South African political party) politicians
Premiers of Limpopo
Members of the Limpopo Provincial Legislature